Ctenotus eurydice, also known commonly as the brown-backed yellow-lined ctenotus, is a species of skink, a lizard in the family Scincidae. The species is native to New South Wales and Queensland in Australia.

Etymology
The specific name, eurydice, refers to the Greek mythological character Eurydice, wife of Orpheus.

Habitat
The preferred natural habitat of C. eurydice is rocky areas.

Description
C. eurydice has well-developed limbs, with five toes on each of its four feet.

Reproduction
C. eurydice is oviparous.

References

Further reading
Cogger HG (2014). Reptiles and Amphibians of Australia, Seventh Edition. Clayton, Victoria, Australia: CSIRO Publishing. xxx + 1,033 pp. .
Czechura GV, Wombey JC (1982). "Three new striped skinks (Ctenotus, Lacertilia, Scincidae) from Queensland". Memoirs of the Queensland Museum 20: 639–645. (Ctenotus eurydice, new species).
Wilson S, Swan G (2013). A Complete Guide to Reptiles of Australia, Fourth Edition. Sydney: New Holland Publishers. 522 pp. .

eurydice
Reptiles described in 1982
Taxa named by Greg V. Czechura
Taxa named by John C. Wombey